Filippo Florio (born 23 April 1996) is an Italian football player.

Club career
He made his Serie C debut for Ischia on 6 September 2015 in a game against Lupa Castella Romani.

On 2 September 2019, he signed with Teramo.

References

External links
 

1996 births
Footballers from Naples
Living people
Italian footballers
Association football defenders
Rimini F.C. 1912 players
Ascoli Calcio 1898 F.C. players
S.S.D. Lucchese 1905 players
Santarcangelo Calcio players
S.S. Ischia Isolaverde players
Pordenone Calcio players
S.S. Teramo Calcio players
Serie B players
Serie C players
Serie D players